Srodes is a surname. Notable people with the surname include:

James Srodes (1940–2017), American journalist and author
John Miller Srodes (1809–1882), American military personnel